Balloon is a 2019 Chinese drama film directed by Pema Tseden. It was screened in the Horizons section at the 76th Venice International Film Festival.

Synopsis 
The film evokes a Tibetan family's struggle between religious conservatism and sexual emancipation. Drolkar and her husband have three sons and are sheep farmers. In order to comply with the one-child policy implemented by the Chinese authorities, Drolkar uses condoms as a means of contraception, a practice that is not very widespread in this traditional society.

Cast
 Tso Yangshik
 Wangmo Sonam

Accolades

References

External links
 
 
 

2019 films
2019 drama films
Chinese drama films
Chinese-language films
Tibetan-language films